Revaz may refer to:
A Georgian masculine given name; see რევაზ for the etymology
Revaz Chelebadze, Soviet football player
Revaz Dogonadze, Georgian scientist
Revaz Dzodzuashvili, Georgian football manager
Revaz Gabashvili, Georgian politician
Revaz Kemoklidze, Georgian football player
Revaz Tchomakhidze, Russian water polo player
Ditavan, Armenia - formerly Revaz

 
Georgian masculine given names